Navaratnam is a Tamil male given name. Due to the Tamil tradition of using patronymic surnames it may also be a surname for males and females.

Notable people

Given name
 K. Navaratnam (born 1935), Sri Lankan politician
 Kumar Navaratnam, Sri Lankan musician
 Ramon Navaratnam, Malaysian economist
 Summa Navaratnam (born 1925), Ceylonese athlete
 Suresh Navaratnam (born 1975), Malaysian cricketer
 V. Navaratnam (1909–2006), Ceylonese politician
 V. N. Navaratnam (1929–1991), Ceylonese politician

Surname
 Rosemary Navaratnam (born 1932), Sri Lankan author
 Timothy Navaratnam Horshington (died 2002), Ceylonese broadcaster

See also
 

Tamil masculine given names